Mahongole may refer to:

 Mahongole, Iringa -Tanzania
 Mahongole, Mbeya -Tanzania